Yusuf Adamu Gagdi (born November 5, 1980) is a politician of the All Progressives Congress from Plateau State, Nigeria. He is a member of the Nigeria Federal House of Representatives from Pankshin/Kanam/Kanke federal constituency of Plateau State in the 9th National Assembly. He was elected to the house in 2019.

References 

Nigerian politicians
Hausa people
1980 births
Living people